Kanye West discography may refer to:

 Kanye West albums discography, a list of albums released by Kanye West
 Kanye West production discography, a list of works produced by Kanye West
 Kanye West singles discography, a list of singles released by Kanye West

See also
 Kanye West videography, a list of music videos, video albums and other media appearances by Kanye West
 List of songs recorded by Kanye West, a list of all songs officially released by Kanye West